The 2006 Formula 3 Euro Series season was the fourth championship year of Europe’s premier Formula Three series. As in previous years, there were ten rounds – each with two races – held at a variety of European circuits. Each weekend consisted of one 60-minute practice session and one qualifying session, followed by one c.110 km race and one c.80 km race. In a revised qualifying system that used only one session, the starting order for race 2 was determined by the finishing order of race 1, with the top eight positions reversed.

Summary
2006 saw the Euro Series make its debut at three venues: Brands Hatch in the UK, the Circuit de Catalunya near Barcelona in Spain, and Le Mans. This was the first time that rounds had been held in Britain and Spain.

A number of regulatory changes took place prior to the 2006 season. Mid-season testing was heavily restricted to a maximum of 10 days per driver/car, with no testing at race venues, leaving teams and drivers to make the most of the race weekend test sessions. The qualifying session for race 2 was dropped in favour of a result-based reverse grid system. The finishing order of race 1 decided the grid for race 2, with the top eight finishers reversed. Chassis specifications of between two and four years old (from 2002–2004) were permitted for the first time, with the creation of the Drivers' Trophy title. Eligibility for this award was restricted to drivers who were not more than 22 years old.

After Lewis Hamilton's domination of the 2005 season, the 2006 championship battle was considerably closer. The title was won by Scotsman Paul di Resta, who ended the year 11 points ahead of Germany's Sebastian Vettel. For much of the season, di Resta and Vettel were exchanging the points lead, but the German's focus wavered towards the end of the year. BMW-Sauber's motorsport director Mario Theissen attributed this to the busy schedule that Vettel undertook as his team's test driver in the last three Grands Prix of the 2006 F1 season. Other drivers worthy of note included Kamui Kobayashi, who finished on the podium twice on the way to winning the Rookie Cup, and race winner Kazuki Nakajima, whose performances attracted a testing contract with Williams.

Not surprisingly, the two main championship contenders were team-mates at ASM Formule 3, the French-based team that has dominated the Euro Series for the last three seasons with three Drivers' and Teams' Championship titles in succession. 2006 saw another improvement in form from Manor Motorsport – a former multiple champion team in British F3. With Japan's Kohei Hirate and the experienced Esteban Guerrieri, it was frequently ASM's closest challenger and finished 2nd in the Teams' Championship standings. This year, Manor was no longer the sole British team in the Euroseries – it was joined by entries from Hitech Racing and Fortec Motorsport at Hockenheim (round 1) and Brands Hatch (round 4).

With only one race win for an Opel-powered car – from a reverse-grid pole position – it was another season of domination by the HWA-built Mercedes engine. Dallara was the de facto sole supplier of chassis, with the Signature SLC project on indefinite hold and the Mygale chassis still yet to race in this series.

Teams and drivers

Driver changes
 Changed Teams
 Richard Antinucci: Team Midland Euroseries → HBR Motosport
 Giedo van der Garde: Team Rosberg → ASM Formule 3
 Esteban Guerrieri: Team Midland Euroseries → Manor Motosport
 Kohei Hirate: Team Rosberg → Manor Motosport
 Paul di Resta: Manor Motorsport → ASM Formule 3
 Sebastian Vettel: Mücke Motorsport → ASM Formule 3

 Entering/Re-Entering Formula 3 Euro Series
 Richard Antinucci: All-Japan Formula Three Championship (TOM'S) → HBR Motorsport
 Récardo Bruins Choi: Formula Renault 2.0 Germany & Formula Renault 2.0 Netherlands (van Amersfoort Racing) → van Amersfoort Racing
 Sébastien Buemi: Formula BMW ADAC (ADAC Berlin-Brandenburg e.V.) → ASL Mücke Motorsport
 Yelmer Buurman: Formula Renault 2.0 UK (Fortec Motorsport) →	Fortec Motorsport
 Peter Elkmann: Recaro Formel 3 Cup (Jo Zeller Racing) →  Jo Zeller Racing
 Natacha Gachnang: Formula BMW ADAC (Josef Kaufmann Racing) → Bordoli Motorsport
 Romain Grosjean: Championnat de France Formula Renault 2.0 & Eurocup Formula Renault 2.0 (SG Formula) → Signature-Plus
 Michael Herck: British Formula 3 Championship & Austria Formula 3 Cup (Junior Racing Team) →  Bas Leinders Junior Racing Team
 James Jakes: Formula Renault 2.0 UK (Team aka) →	Hitech Racing
 Charlie Kimball: British Formula 3 Championship (Carlin Motorsport) →  Signature-Plus
 Kamui Kobayashi: Formula Renault 2.0 Italy & Eurocup Formula Renault 2.0 (Prema Powerteam) → ASM Formule 3
 Dominick Muermans: Formula Renault 2.0 Germany & Formula Renault 2.0 Netherlands (van Amersfoort Racing) → van Amersfoort Racing
 Kazuki Nakajima: All-Japan Formula Three Championship (TOM'S) → Manor Motorsport
 Paolo Maria Nocera: Italian Formula Three Championship (Lucidi Motors) → Prema Powerteam
 Ronayne O'Mahony: British Formula 3 Championship (Fortec Motorsport) →  Prema Powerteam
 Filip Salaquarda: Recaro Formel 3 Cup (ISR Racing) →  Team I.S.R.
 Tim Sandtler: Formula BMW ADAC (Mamerow Racing) → Signature Plus
 Roberto Streit: All-Japan Formula Three Championship (Inging) → Prema Powerteam
 Jonathan Summerton: Formula BMW ADAC (Team Rosberg) → ASL Mücke Motorsport
 João Urbano: Formula BMW ADAC (ADAC Berlin-Brandenburg e.V.) → Prema Powerteam
 James Walker: British Formula 3 Championship (Fortec Motorsport) → Hitech Racing

 Entering Trophy Class
 Julien Abelli: Karting → Janiec Racing Team
 Gina-Maria Adenauer: Toyota Yaris Cup Germany → SMS Seyffarth Motorsport
 Cemil Çipa: Formula 3 Turkey → HBR Motorsport
 Kevin Fank: Recaro Formel 3 Cup Trophy Class (JMS Motorsport) → SMS Seyffarth Motorsport
 Bruno Fechner: Formula Renault 2.0 Germany (Kern Motorsport) → SMS Seyffarth Motorsport
 Anthony Janiec: French Formula Three Championship Class B (JMP Racing) → Janiec Racing Team
 Dominik Schraml: Recaro Formel 3 Cup (Swiss Racing Team) → SMS Seyffarth Motorsport

 Leaving Formula 3 Euro Series
 Átila Abreu: Mücke Motorsport → StockCar Brasil (RS Competições)
 Rob Austin: Team Midland Euroseries → SEAT Cupra Great Britain R class (Startline Services)
 Marco Bonanomi: Prema Powerteam → Euroseries 3000 (Fisichella Motor Sport) & World Series by Renault (Tech 1 Racing)
 Fabio Carbone: Signature → All-Japan Formula Three Championship (Three Bond Racing)
 Ben Clucas: Team Midland Euroseries → Australian Formula 3 (Bronte Rundle Motorsport)
 Loïc Duval: Signature Plus → Formula Nippon (PIAA Nakajima Racing) & Super GT (Nakajima Racing)
 Gregory Franchi: Prema Powerteam → World Series by Renault (Prema Powerteam)
 Maximilian Götz: ASM Formule 3 → International Formula Master (ISR Racing)
 Lucas di Grassi: Manor Motorsport → GP2 Series (Durango)
 Lewis Hamilton: ASM Formule 3 → GP2 Series (ART Grand Prix)
 Thomas Holzer: AM-Holzer Rennsport → Retirement
 Stephen Jelley: Team Midland Euroseries → British Formula 3 Championship (Räikkönen Robertson Racing)
 Paolo Montin: Ombra Racing → Porsche Carrera Cup Italy (Bonaldi Motorsport)
 Hannes Neuhauser: HBR Motorsport → Porsche Supercup (Konrad Motorsport)
 Alejandro Núñez: HBR Motorsport → Prema Powerteam
 Franck Perera: Prema Powerteam → GP2 Series (DAMS)
 James Rossiter: Signature Plus → World Series by Renault (Pons Racing)
 Adrian Sutil: ASM Formule 3 → All-Japan Formula Three Championship (TOM's)
 Nico Verdonck: Team Midland Euroseries → Spanish Formula Three by Toyota (R. Llusia Racing)
 Ross Zwolsman: RZ Racing → ATS Formel 3 Cup (Rennsport Rössler)
 Danny Watts: HBR Motorsport → Porsche Carrera Cup Great Britain (Red Line Racing)

Additional participations
Prema Powerteam's third entry was taken over by Italy's Paulo Maria Nocera for four rounds, starting at the Nürburgring. He in turn was replaced by Brazil's Roberto Streit at the final round of the season. Bruno Rudolf Fechner started five races in SMS Seyffarth Motorsport's #44 entry, but was substituted  by fellow German Dominik Schraml in round 3 at Oschersleben. The #44 car was not present at every round. Schraml made a one-off return at the Norisring, driving a Dallara-Opel for FS Motorsport. Kevin Fank's #42 SMS Seyffarth Motorsport entry returned at the Norisring in the hands of Gina Maria Adenauer before it, too, failed to make another appearance. Like the drivers that they replaced, Schraml and Adenauer were eligible for the Drivers' Trophy. Julien Abelli, of Janiec Racing, did not make any appearances until the Le Mans round.

In round 5 at the Norisring, F3 rookie Natacha Gachnang of Switzerland drove a second entry for Jo Zeller Racing. She also competed in rounds 6, 9, and 10. In the F3 Masters at Zandvoort, ATS F3 Cup team Van Amersfoort Racing made a one-off appearance with two cars for its Cup regulars, Dominik Muermans and Récardo Bruins Choi.

Calendar
 The series supported the Deutsche Tourenwagen Masters at all rounds.

Results

Season standings
The Drivers' Trophy is restricted to drivers who are not more than 22 years old, using chassis specifications that are 2 to 4 years old.

Drivers Standings
Points are awarded as follows:

† — Drivers did not finish the race, but were classified as they completed over 90% of the race distance.

The effects of the new reverse-grid system – which put the 8th-placed finisher from race 1 on pole for race 2 – can be seen clearly in this chart. 50% of the race 2 pole sitters went on to win, while there was only one double winner (Vettel in round 6) and no other race 1 winner even reached the podium in race 2.

Rookie Cup
Rookie drivers are only eligible for the Rookie Cup title if they have not previously competed in a national or international Formula 3 championship.

Team Standings

Nations Cup

Notes

References

External links
Forix.autosport.com
Formel3guide.com (German language)
Speedsport Magazine

Formula 3 Euro Series seasons
Formula 3 Euro Series
Euro Series
Formula 3 Euro Series